Gilli may refer to:

People
Gilli (surname), including a list of people with the name
Gilli (Hebridean earl), tenth-century earl in the Hebrides
Gilli (Løgmaður), an eleventh-century Faroese lawman
Gilli (rapper) (born 1992), a Danish rapper
Gilli Smyth (1933–2016), English musician
Gilli Rólantsson (born 1992), a Faroese footballer
Gilli Davies, Welsh chef
Gilli Moon, singer-songwriter and record producer

Places
Gilli, Iran, a village in Markazi Province, Iran

Film
Gilli (film), an Indian film
Ghilli, a Tamil language film

Other
Gilli (mango), also known as Totapuri, a mango cultivar grown in India

See also
 Gillie (disambiguation)